At Night may refer to:

 At Night (film), a 2007 short Danish film
 "At Night" (song), a 2002 song by Shakedown
 "At Night" (short story), a short story by Franz Kafka
 "At Night", a 1980 song by Eddie and the Hot Rods
 "At Night", a 1996 song by Flying Saucer Attack
 "At Night", a 1963 song by Neil Diamond
 "At Night", a 1963 song by Paul Anka